HMAS Kuranda is a former Royal Australian Navy (RAN) base located in Cairns, Queensland in Australia that was is in used during the Pacific War of World War II.

See also
List of former Royal Australian Navy bases

References

Closed facilities of the Royal Australian Navy
Cairns, Queensland
Military education and training in Australia
1943 establishments in Australia
Military units and formations established in 1943